Svalia is a village in the municipality of Overhalla in Trøndelag county, Norway.

References

Villages in Trøndelag
Overhalla